The 2007 Marshall Thundering Herd football team represented Marshall University during the 2007 NCAA Division I FBS football season. Marshall competed as a member of the East Division of Conference USA (C-USA), and played their home games at Joan C. Edwards Stadium.  The Thundering Herd finished the season 3–9, 3–5 in C-USA play.

2007 season

References

Marshall
Marshall Thundering Herd football seasons
Marshall Thundering Herd football